Sale-Liis Teesalu (born 14 January 1997) is an Estonian badminton player.

Achievements

BWF International Challenge/Series 
Women's doubles

  BWF International Challenge tournament
  BWF International Series tournament
  BWF Future Series tournament

References

External links 
 

1997 births
Living people
Sportspeople from Tartu
Estonian female badminton players